Robert Stanley Ham (born 29 March 1942) is an English retired football player and manager who played for Bradford Park Avenue, Gainsborough Trinity, Bradford City, Preston and Rotherham. He also managed Gainsborough, Matlock and Guiseley.

Speedway
Ham was the promoter of the Bradford Dukes motorcycle speedway team with his brother Alan. His company has sponsored British riders including former British Champion and current Grand Prix rider Scott Nicholls, Josh Auty and Joe Haines.

External links
 
 Bradford City profile

1942 births
Living people
English footballers
English football managers
Bradford (Park Avenue) A.F.C. players
Gainsborough Trinity F.C. players
Grimsby Town F.C. players
Bradford City A.F.C. players
Preston North End F.C. players
Rotherham United F.C. players
Gainsborough Trinity F.C. managers
Speedway promoters
Footballers from Bradford
Association football forwards